Paul Frederick de Quincey (26 November 1828 – 15 April 1894) was a 19th-century Member of Parliament in Auckland, New Zealand.

Early life
De Quincey was born at Grasmere, Westmoreland. He was the son of the great English writer Thomas De Quincey. He received his education at the High School, Edinburgh, and at the Lasswade School, near that city. He entered the army 2 May 1845 as ensign in the 70th (Surrey) Regiment, and served with distinction in India from 1846, including being present with the 80th (Staffordshire Volunteers) Regiment at the Battle of Sobraon in February 1846, during the first Anglo-Sikh War, for which he was awarded the campaign medal. He became a lieutenant on 31 July 1846, and captain on 9 January 1858. In 1860, having become successively captain and major of brigade on the permanent staff of the Bengal Presidency, he was ordered with his old regiment, which he had rejoined after serving with several others, for active service in New Zealand.

New Zealand
Colonel de Quincey arrived in that colony in May 1861, served there for a time, commanded the 1st Company Transport Corps, and then rejoined his regiment; but seeing no prospect of returning to India without sacrificing his position, sold out, and turned his attention to farming, with the unsatisfactory results usually experienced by military men. In 1863, the war in the Waikato breaking out, and the Auckland Militia being called out for active service, he was appointed to the command of the left wing of the 3rd Battalion Artillery, with a captain's commission and without pay, and embodied it on those terms. Major-General Galloway, under whom he had served in India, on being appointed to the command of the colonial forces selected Captain de Quincey as his military secretary, to which appointment he was gazetted with the rank of major, and soon afterwards he was gazetted to a lieutenant-colonelcy. On General Galloway leaving the colony in 1864, he was succeeded in the command by Colonel Haultain, Lieut.-Col. de Quincey continuing as military secretary.

Since the Waikato war in the Auckland Province finished in 1864, he lived principally in the country. For a time, he was acting coroner in Howick.

On 13 February 1866, he married Charlotte Emily Pilling at Howick. She was the widow of Captain Oswald Pilling. His stepdaughter was Florence Henrietta Pilling, who married John FitzRoy Beresford Peacocke in 1875. Peacocke's father, Stephen Ponsonby Peacocke, had been a member of the New Zealand Legislative Council until his death in 1872.

In 1889, he was appointed as Serjeant-at-Arms of the House of Representatives by the Speaker. He held this role until his death and was succeeded by William Fraser.

He died at his residence, Cambridge House in Vincent Street in central Auckland, on Sunday, 15 April 1894. He was buried in nearby Purewa.

Notes

References

1828 births
1894 deaths
Members of the New Zealand House of Representatives
New Zealand MPs for Auckland electorates
19th-century New Zealand politicians
People from Grasmere (village)